The 2015 New Zealand Music Awards was the 50th holding of the annual ceremony featuring awards for musical recording artists based in or originating from New Zealand. It took place on 19 November 2015 at Vector Arena in Auckland and was hosted by Taika Waititi. The awards show was broadcast live on TV3, and hosted by Sharyn Casey and Dominic Bowden. 2015 marks the 50th anniversary of the awards from its origins in 1965 as the Loxene Golden Disc.

The awards were dominated by Broods, who won Album of the Year, Best Group, Best Pop Album, and Radio Airplay Record of the Year. Marlon Williams won two awards, Best Male Solo Artist and Breakthrough Artist of the Year. Lorde won Single of the Year and shared the International Achievement award with Savage.

Early awards 
While most of the awards will be presented at the main awards ceremony held in November, five genre awards were presented earlier in the year at ceremonies of their field.
 The first was awarded in January, with the Tui for Best Folk Album presented at the Auckland Folk Festival in Kumeu to Auckland group Great North for their album Up In Smoke.
 The Tui for Best Jazz Album was presented in April at the National Jazz Festival in Tauranga to Auckland band DOG for their debut album DOG.
 The Best Country Music Album Tui was presented in May at the New Zealand Country Music Awards in Gore to Tami Neilson for her album Dynamite!.
 The Tui for Best Pacific Music Album was presented in June at the Vodafone Pacific Music Awards to the duo Cydel for their album Memoirs of a Midnight Cowboy.
 In August the Best Children's Music Album award was presented live on What Now to fleaBITE for her album The Jungle is Jumping.

The nominees for the three technical awards were announced on 1 October, and the technical award winners, legacy award recipient and the Critics' Choice Prize shortlist were announced on 13 October. The Critics Choice showcase and award presentation will be held on 5 November.

Controversy 

During the live broadcast of the main awards ceremony, six awards - including Best Maori Album - were presented during the ad breaks and omitted from the television broadcast. This was criticised by previous NZMA winner Tama Waipara, who described the incident as "disgusting and it's not surprising but it is extremely disappointing and moreover, it's unconstitutional." A Mediaworks spokesperson responded, saying, "We can't broadcast the entire awards ceremony without commercial breaks, so many awards aren't televised."

Nominees and winners 

The main nominees were revealed on 13 October 2015. The Best Gospel / Christian Album category was renamed Best Worship Album.

Winners are listed first and highlighted in boldface.
Key
 – Technical award

References

External links 
 Official New Zealand Music Awards website

New Zealand Music Awards, 2015
New Zealand Music Awards, 2015
Aotearoa Music Awards
November 2015 events in New Zealand